Following is a list of senators of Deux-Sèvres, people who have represented the department of Deux-Sèvres in the Senate of France.

Third Republic

Senators for Deux-Sèvres under the French Third Republic were:

Alfred Monnet (1876–1882)
Alcide Taillefert (1876–1882)
Marie-Clément de Reignié (1882–1885)
Pierre Goguet (1882–1886)
Émile Bergeon (1885–1891)
François Garran de Balzan (1886–1902)
Léo Aymé (1891)
Camille Jouffrault (1891–1905)
Théodore Girard (1895–1918)
Louis Aguillon (1903–1920)
Léopold Goirand (1906–1920)
Hippolyte Gentil (1920–1927)
Pierre Brangier (1920–1927)
René Héry (1920–1940)
Louis Dutaud (1927–1929)
André Goirand (1927–1940)
Louis Demellier (1929–1940)

Fourth Republic

Senators for Deux-Sèvres under the French Fourth Republic were:

Émile Poirault (1946–1948)
Yvon Coudé du Foresto (1946–1948 and 1955–1959)
Camille Héline (1948–1952)
Félix Lelant (1948–1957)
Jacques Ménard (1957–1959)

Fifth Republic 
Senators for Deux-Sèvres under the French Fifth Republic:

References

Sources

 
Lists of members of the Senate (France) by department